Jhi or JHI may refer to:
 Jahai language
 James Hutton Institute
 Jewish Historical Institute
 Jhi Yeon-woo (born 1984), South Korean bodybuilder
 Ji (Korean name), a Korean family name
 Jim Henson Interactive
 Journal of the History of Ideas